Burlington City Arts (formerly The Firehouse Gallery, or The Center, or the Firehouse Center for the Visual Arts) is an art gallery, art education/studio centre and cultural events space in Burlington, Vermont. The building was originally built as the Ethan Allen Firehouse on Church Street in 1889. The building is owned by the City of Burlington. Burlington City Arts uses the building for its exhibits, lectures, and educational programs. The gallery has been open since 1995.

History
The Ethan Allen Firehouse is a community landmark in downtown Burlington. It was designed by local architect A.B. Fisher and completed in 1889. With an 85-foot bell tower, the Firehouse ranked as the tallest building in Burlington in 1889. It began its life as home to the Ethan Allen Engine Company No. 4, one of Burlington’s seven volunteer fire departments. In 1927 the Burlington Police Department took over the building for 40 years.

After the police department moved to South Winooski Avenue in 1967, it was unoccupied for two years and fell into a state of disrepair. The building was scheduled for demolition in 1973 but community interest compelled the Board of Aldermen to stop the demolition plans and put those funds towards the stabilization of the building.

A number of service operations took up residence there in the years that followed, including the offices of U.S. Senator Patrick Leahy, and the University of Vermont’s Church Street Center.

BCA first began developing the concept of an arts center in 1995, soon after the Firehouse Gallery moved into half of the ground floor. The Ethan Allen Firehouse was selected for this concept.

Renovation

In 1999, the City Council voted to transform the firehouse into the Firehouse Center for the Visual Arts. BCA hired an architect for the renovation and in the spring of 2001, they began construction. After a few months, progress stopped when a large crack developed on the north wall and the building sank by about 4 inches (100 mm). After much stabilization, construction resumed.

To complete the renovation, Shelburne Museum returned the original bell back to the Firehouse tower.

The BCA Center (formerly Firehouse Center for the Visual Arts) opened to the public in 2002.  It includes a community darkroom and photography studio; artist-in-residence studio; multimedia conference facility for lectures, film series, and panel discussions; and Resource Room and Library with public meeting space and Internet access.

The BCA Center galleries

The BCA Center presents exhibitions, and high-quality artwork, as well as exhibition-related discussions, and arts activities. Their exhibitions and education programming attempt to build and sustain audiences for contemporary art outside of major urban centers.

Roof and Cupola

In 2001, BCA Center learned that the Shelburne Museum hoped to give the original bell back to the Firehouse tower. Ravaged by years of water, damage, a re-engineering and renovation of the tower as well as a concentrated fundraising effort took place. The bell was hoisted back into its home on September 12, 2002.

See also
List of museums in Vermont

References

External links

Burlington City Arts - official site

Art museums and galleries in Vermont
Museums in Burlington, Vermont
Arts centers in Vermont
Tourist attractions in Chittenden County, Vermont
Art galleries established in 1995
1995 establishments in Vermont